The SAF Day Parade is an annual military parade and ceremony of the Singapore Armed Forces (SAF) held on 1 July in commemoration of the founding of the SAF. It is the second military parade in seniority to be held in Singapore next to the Singapore National Day Parade on 9 August. It is usually held at the SAFTI Military Institute in Jurong West, with the presence of the president of Singapore. Salutes are also taken by the prime minister of Singapore, and the chief of Defence Force.

Close to 3,000 Operationally Ready National Serviceman (NSmen) take part in the ceremony, including personnel of any one of the Singapore Armed Forces Bands (either the SAF Central Band or SAF Ceremonial Band A) or the Singapore Armed Forces Military Police Command. The SAF performs a traditional Trooping the Colour ceremony during the parade, following the British Army regimental tradition. The awards for the Singapore Armed Forces Best Unit Competition are conferred upon the winning units during the parade. The current year's winner make up the parade's 2 Guards, which is typically the 1st Commando Battalion of the Commandos formation. The outgoing colour bearer for the Singapore Army hands the Army's State colour to the colour bearer for the Best Combat Unit of the year. As for 3 Guards and 4 Guards, these are, organised and arranged based on the NDP guard of honour, with Naval Diving Unit representing the Republic of Singapore Navy (RSN) and the Air Power Generation Command representing the Republic of Singapore Air Force (RSAF). 10 supporting units are also located to the rear of the guard of honour formation. A re-affirmation of the Singapore National Pledge of loyalty by all members of the SAF on parade takes place.

History
The first SAF Day in 1969 was celebrated with a military parade at Jalan Besar Stadium with Minister for the Interior and Defence Lim Kim San being the presiding officer. A muster parade at the MID HQ on Pearl's Hill also took place as well as several smaller parades at various SAF camps. During the first parade, a 1,500-strong contingent of SAF personnel took part in the marchpast, as well as stood at attention during the presentation of the
SAF Flag for the first time to the 3rd Battalion, Singapore Infantry Regiment by Minister Lim. NSmen were allowed to participate in the parade as commanders for the first time in 1994. The first national service officer to be Parade Commander of the SAF Day Parade was Lieutenant Colonel Johnny Lim. The 2015 parade was known as the SAF50 Parade in commemoration of the 50th anniversary of the parade, which included a special aerial flypast fighter planes and helicopters as well as the attendance of SAF pioneers who were present at the first SAF Day Parade in 1969.

See also
Armed Forces Day

References

External links

Annual events in Singapore
Military parades in Singapore
Military history of Singapore
July events
Recurring events established in 1969
1969 establishments in Singapore